Trematuridae is a family of mites in the order Mesostigmata.

Genera
 Ipiduropoda Sellnick, 1952
 Trematuroides Cooreman, 1960
 Trichofrondosa W. Hirschmann, 1986
 Trichoobscura W. Hirschmann, 1986
 Trichouropoda Berlese, 1916

References

Mesostigmata
Acari families